A commercial building is a building used for commercial purposes.  It may also refer to:
Commercial Building (South Bend, Indiana)
Commercial Building (Alexandria, Louisiana)
Commercial Building (Natchez, Mississippi)
Commercial Building at 32 West Bridge Street, Catskill, New York
Commercial Building at 500 North Tryon Street, Charlotte, North Carolina
Commercial Building (Dayton, Ohio)
Commercial Building (Elyria, Ohio)
Governor's Inn, also known as the "Commercial Building"
Commercial Building at 4113 Guadalupe Street, Austin, Texas